Amalda coccinata is a species of sea snail, a marine gastropod mollusk in the family Ancillariidae.

Description

Distribution
This marine species occurs off South Australia and Western Australia.

References

coccinata
Gastropods described in 1980